The ladies' single skating competition of the 2014 Winter Olympics was held at the Iceberg Skating Palace in Sochi, Russia. The short program took place on 19 February 2014, and the free skating took place on 20 February. Adelina Sotnikova of Russia won the gold medal, generating much controversy over the partiality of the judges and the new scoring system.

Result and subsequent debate
With an overall score of 224.59 points, seventeen-year-old Adelina Sotnikova became one of the youngest figure-skating Olympic champions, edging out silver-medalist and defending-champion Yuna Kim and bronze-medalist Carolina Kostner.

After the short program, Kim was in first place, .28 points ahead of Sotnikova. In the free-skate program, Sotnikova performed, in terms of base points, a more challenging routine than Kim, giving her more opportunities for points. In addition to more triple jumps and more difficult footwork (as determined by the caller), Sotnikova performed a double Axel-triple toe, a challenging combination that Kim did not attempt. However, Sotnikova's routine also featured a relatively significant error—she stepped out of a jumping combination—, while Kim's program was executed without any glaring missteps. The judges assessed Kim's free-skate program as having demonstrated greater artistry; her component score was .09 points higher than Sotnikova's. But Sotnikova's base technical score (a measurement of the difficulty of executed moves) was 3.94 points higher than Kim's, and her grade of execution score (based on the average technical evaluation of each element, examining whether the proper edge was used, the speed carried into and out of a jump, jump positioning, and more) was scored 1.91 points higher.

The result sparked a debate over the judges' objectivity, spurred in part by the composition of the judging panel, which included judges from four former Soviet bloc nations, including Russia. The Russian judge, Alla Shekhovtsova, was one of several people Sotnikova embraced prior to the flower ceremony. Over 1.7 million people signed a Change.org petition calling for an investigation into the outcome. That petition  attracted a million signatures faster than any previous Change.org petition; at one point, it was attracting 100,000 new signatures every 15 minutes, with 90% of signatures coming from inside Korea.

Several commentators attributed the result to the revised scoring system that had been adopted in 2006, a system generally thought to "favor mathematics at the expense of artistry": Alice Park, writing for Time, suggested that, contrary to popular belief, Sotnikova's surprising win was a consequence of objectivity rather than subjectivity: specifically, she argued, the redesigned scoring system heavily rewarded technical difficulty,  giving a substantial advantage to those with more challenging starting programs, while de-emphasizing the judge's impression of performers. Bryan Armen Graham, writing for The Atlantic, contended that the polarized reaction to the result was due to a generational gap brought about by the changed scoring system, saying, "Those who came up watching figure skating under the old 6.0 system are probably accustomed to more leeway in the judging." Some in the skating community also seemed to take this view: While noting that she "personally enjoyed Yuna Kim's performance more," Michelle Kwan, two-time Olympic medalist and five-time World champion, stated, "Under the scoring system, hands down, Adelina won." Four-time men's champion Kurt Browning said that "Yuna Kim outskated [Sotnikova], but it’s not just a skating competition anymore—it’s math." And Scott Hamilton, the 1984 Olympic champion, said that, while Sotnikova's skating was not as aesthetically pleasing as Kim's, her athletic style "check[ed] off every box" and "d[id] everything the judges are looking for."

Beyond the scoring system, the results seemed to divide former professional skaters:
Katarina Witt, a two-time Olympic champion, said, "I am stunned by this result, I don’t understand the scoring." Two-time bronze medalist Michael Weiss attributed Sotnikova's scores to "home-field inflation." But three-time world champion and two-time Olympic silver medalist Elvis Stojko said that the result "was totally fair," as "Kim didn't have enough technical ammunition." And Alexei Mishin, the Russian 1969 world medalist and coach to three Olympic champions, said that "Sotnikova's victory [was] absolutely natural and objective," and claimed that "some are [simply] jealous of Sotnikova's success."

Official responses
On 21 February 2014, the International Skating Union (ISU) issued a statement which asserted all rules and procedures were applied during the competition and declared confidence "in the high quality and integrity of the ISU judging system", noting "judges were selected by random drawing from a pool of 13 potential judges" and that all nine judges on the free skating panel were from different nations.

On 10 April, the Korean Olympic Committee (KOC) and the Korean Skating Union (KSU) filed an official complaint with the ISU Disciplinary Commission (DC) concerning judging. The complaint was regarding "the wrongful constitution of the panel of judges and the unjust outcome of the competition". It requested that the DC conduct a thorough investigation, "take appropriate disciplinary actions against the concerned individuals", and institute corrective actions. On 14 April, the DC ruled the complaint inadmissible because a general request for investigation is not within DC's jurisdiction and the complaint was not addressed at an individual or federation as required.

On 30 April, the KOC and KSU filed a second official complaint with the DC. This time the complaint was against Russian judge Alla Shekhovtsova and the Figure Skating Federation of Russia (FSFR), specifically citing a hug Shekhovtsova shared with Sotnikova and Shekhovtsova's marriage to the current Director General of the FSFR. On 30 May, the DC dismissed the complaint. It ruled Shekhovtsova "is not responsible for the judging panel's composition", her marriage did not create a conflict of interest, and since Sotnikova initiated the hug, Shekhovtsova did not break any rules by responding.

Records
For complete list of figure skating records, see list of highest scores in figure skating.

The following ISU season best scores (2013–2014) were set during this competition:

Schedule
All dates and times are (UTC+4).

Results

Short program
The short program (SP) took place on 19 February 2014.

Free skating
The Free skating took place on 20 February 2014.

Overall
The skaters are ranked according to their overall score.

Judges and officials
Short Program judges

Judge 1:  Robert Rosenbluth
Judge 2:  Karen Howard
Judge 3:  Franco Benini
Judge 4:  Birgit Föll
Judge 5:  Diana Stevens
Judge 6:  Nobuhiko Yoshioka
Judge 7:  Katarina Henriksson
Judge 8:  Adriana Domanska
Judge 9:  Koh Sung-Hee

Free Skating judges

Judge 1:  Birgit Föll
Judge 2:  Yuri Balkov
Judge 3:  Franco Benini
Judge 4:  Zanna Kulik
Judge 5:  Nobuhiko Yoshioka
Judge 6:  Alla Shekhovtsova
Judge 7:  Hélène Cucuphat
Judge 8:  Karen Howard
Judge 9:  Adriana Domanska

 Technical controller:  Alexander Lakernik
 Technical specialist:  Vanessa Gusmeroli
 Assistant technical specialist:  Olga Baranova
 Referee:  Diana Barbacci Levy
 Data operator:  David Santee
 Replay operator:  Alexander Kuznetsov

References

External links
 Sochi 2014 Figure Skating – Ladies' Singles page 
 Sochi 2014 Figure Skating Results Book
 2014 Winter Olympics page at the International Skating Union
 

Ladies
Women's events at the 2014 Winter Olympics
Oly